Gerald Peter Curatola, D.D.S. (born November 10, 1957), also known as Dr. Gerry, is a dentist, Associate Professor at New York University, author and humanitarian best known for his contributions in cosmetic dentistry and wellness. He is a frequent dental expert contributor to Fox News Channel, AOL Health,  and Dr. Oz, and has appeared on the Martha Stewart Show, NBC's Your Total Health, and ABC networks. Dr. Curatola is the founder of Rejuvenation Dentistry, and the co-inventor and co-developer of REVITIN Oral Therapy.

Early life and education
Gerald Peter Curatola was born on November 10, 1957 in New York City to Italian American parents, Vincent James Curatola and Mildred Theresa Muccitelli. His father, Vincent, was the son of Italian immigrants, Dominic and Antoinette Curatola from Calabria, Italy. His mother, Mildred, was the daughter of Italian immigrants, Gerardo and Marion Muccitelli, from Rome and Bari, Italy. 
Curatola is second of three children of Vincent and Mildred, having an older brother and younger sister. He grew up in North Woodmere, New York, on Long Island after the family moved from Ozone Park, New York, in 1962.

Curatola attended Chaminade High School in Mineola, New York, a private boy's Catholic preparatory school where he graduated as President of his class in 1975. He went on to Colgate University in Hamilton, New York, graduating in 1979, majoring in Neuroscience, a topical concentration in Biology and Psychology. Curatola began dental school in the Fall of 1979 at New York University College of Dentistry and served as President of his dental school class until becoming the NYUCD Student Body President in his last year until his graduation in 1983.

Curatola has been a member of the teaching faculty at NYU since 1984 serving as a Clinical Instructor in Dental Materials and presently, Clinical Associate Professor in the Department of Cariology and Comprehensive Care.

Early career
In 1982, while in dental school, Curatola organized a dental mission to the island of Jamaica in conjunction with the Ministry of Health in the Jamaican Government and the U.S. Peace Corps, whose facilities were used on the island to provide dental care in critically under-served areas for three months. His work there earned him recognition and a citation from the Jamaican Government.

After graduating from NYU with his D.D.S. degree in 1983, Curatola continued to provide pro bono dentistry to the Bowery Mission in New York City while building his own dental practice with a special interest in the emerging field of Cosmetic Dentistry. By 1985, his cosmetic dentistry work was published in the New York State Dental Journal and garnered the attention of the DenMat Corporation in Santa Maria, CA who hired him as a national lecturing clinician.

In addition to serving as an Assistant Attending in Dentistry at Cabrini Medical Center, Curatola returned to NYU to join the teaching faculty at the College of Dentistry. Around this time, Curatola's interest in Complementary and Alternative Medicine (CAM) led him to pursue a Masters program in Nutrition and Wellness with former NYU classmate and future business partner, Dr. David Shuch, being given at the Pratt Institute in New York City. One of the earliest programs of its time, the program was designed by Integrative Nutrition pioneer, Dr. Alan Pressman. Curatola continued to lecture on cosmetic dentistry while privately researching alternative formulations to better promote oral health. In 1991, he founded the Curatola Dental Group, a general and cosmetic dentistry practice in midtown Manhattan, New York. In 1995, Curatola continued his education in natural medicine, attending Harvard University's Symposiums in Complementary and Alternative Medicine under the direction of Dr. David Eisenberg, the founder of Harvard Medical School's Center for Alternative Medicine Research and Education (now the Division for Research and Education in Complementary and Integrative Medical Therapies of Harvard's Osher Research Center).

Rejuvenation Dentistry
Curatola founded Rejuvenation Dentistry in 2005. There are Rejuvenation Dentistry affiliates in five cities: New York, London, Paris, Rome and East Hampton.

Revitin
Curatola invented Revitin, a prebiotic naturopathic toothpaste.

Humanitarian service and contributions
Following a lifelong model of humanitarian service from his parents and grandparents, Curatola has been committed to charitable work and contributions for most of his youth and adult life. As a dentist, he has traveled to five continents to provide dental services in areas that are under served, as well as educate and equip other dental professionals to do the same.

Locally, Curatola helped to establish the Pediatric Dental Fund of the Hamptons, a dental charity founded by local pediatrician, Dr. Gail Schoenfeld, which provides free dental care to needy children on Long Island's East End. He contributes and provides pro bono dental services to many local charitable organizations including The Retreat, a shelter for victims of domestic violence. 

Curatola serves on the leadership board of the East Hampton Day Care Learning Center and he is past Vice Chair of the American Heart Association's Heart of the Hamptons charity benefit.

Personal life
Curatola met his wife, Georgia Ann Condzal, at NYU while finishing dental school and they were married shortly after his graduation in 1983. They have three children. Gia Ann, born in 1984, Grant Vincent,  born in 1988, and Grace Ann was born in 1992. In 1995, Curatola moved the principal family residence from Manhattan to East Hampton, New York, and became an active supporter of the development of the Ross School in East Hampton. Curatola served on the Ross School's Board of Trustees for seven years, retiring in 2010.  His three children attended and graduated from the Ross School.

Media coverage
Curatola has contributed to numerous television and radio programs including The Dr. Oz Show, The Martha Stewart Show, ABC News, Fox News, NBC, CBS, and CNN. Curatola and Rejuvenation Dentistry have been featured in the New York Post.

Dr. Curatola is the author of the no longer available book, Smile For Life: The Art and Science of Rejuvenation Dentistry.

Honors and awards
Curatola Wing For Clinical Research established at [New York University], November, 2006
Selected into Strathmore's Who's Who Among Business Professionals, March, 2009
Who's Who in America by [Marquis Who's Who], New Providence, N.J. December, 2003

Patents
Awarded United States Patent #6,503,483 for a dental formulation. Jan., 2003 
Awarded United States Patent #6,207,137 for a dental formulation. March, 2001
Awarded United States Patent  #5,925,335 for a dental formulation. July, 1999

References

External links

1957 births
American people of Italian descent
American health and wellness writers
American dentists
Medical educators
Naturopaths
Living people
American dentistry academics
New York University faculty
Writers from Queens, New York
Colgate University alumni
Chaminade High School alumni
New York University College of Dentistry alumni
People from North Woodmere, New York
People from Ozone Park, Queens